This is a list of franchised businesses.

#
 1-800-GOT-JUNK?, junk removal
 241 Pizza, pizza
 7-Eleven, convenience store
 2001 Club, former disco nightclubs

A

 A&W Restaurants, fast food
 AAMCO Transmissions, automotive
 Aaron's, Inc., furniture rental
 Advantage Rent a Car, rental cars
 Allstate, insurance
 AlphaGraphics, print shop
 Amato's, restaurant
 American Poolplayers Association, pool leagues
 AmeriHost, defunct hotels
 Ampm, convenience store
 Applebee's, restaurant
 Arby's, fast food
 Assist-2-Sell, real estate
 The Athlete's Foot, footwear
 Atlanta Bread Company, bakery
 Au Bon Pain, bakery
 Auntie Anne's, pretzel shops
 Avis Car Rental, rental cars

B

 Baker's Dozen Donuts, fast food
 Baskin-Robbins, fast food
 Bata, shoes
 Baymont Inn & Suites, hotels
 Beef `O'Brady's
 Ben & Jerry's, fast food
 Ben Franklin Stores
 Berlitz Language Schools
 Big Apple Bagels
 Big Boy Restaurants
 Big O Tires
 Blackjack Pizza, pizza
 Blake's Lotaburger
 Bojangles' Famous Chicken 'n Biscuits
 Booster Juice
 Borders Group
 Boston Market
 Boston Pizza 
 Bruegger's
 Buffalo Wild Wings, fast food
 Burger King, fast food

C

 Camille's Sidewalk Cafe, restaurant
 Captain D's Seafood, restaurant
 Carl's Jr., fast food
 Cartridge World
 Carvel
 Century 21 Real Estate
 Chatime, tea
 Charley's Grilled Subs
 Checkers Drive-In Restaurants, fast food
 Chem-Dry
 Chester's International, restaurants
 Chick Fil-A, fast food
 Chicken Treat, fast food
 Choice Hotels International, hotels
 Church's Chicken, fast food
 CiCi's Pizza, pizza
 Cinnabon, fast food
 Circle K
 Coffee Beanery, coffee
 Cold Stone Creamery, fast food
 Coldwell Banker Real Estate Corporation
 College Hunks Hauling Junk and College Hunks Moving
 Cookies By Design
 Cousins Subs, fast food
 Culligan Water Conditioning
 Culver Franchising System
 Cuppy's Coffee, coffee
 Curves for Women/Curves International
 CWT, travel management services

D

 Dairy Queen, fast food
 D'Angelo Sandwich Shops, fast food
 Days Inns Worldwide, hotels
 Del Taco, fast food
 Denny's, restaurant
 Dickey's Barbecue Pit, fast casual barbecue
 Dippin' Dots
 Direct Buy
 Discount Tire Company, automotive
 Dog n Suds
 Domino's Pizza, pizza
 Doubletree Hotels, Suites, Resorts
 D.P. Dough, calzones
 Dream Dinners
 Dulce Cafe, restaurant
 Dunkin' Donuts, fast food

E

 Eagle Boys, pizza
 EB Games (formerly Electronics Boutique), video games
 Econo Lodge, hotels
 Edible Arrangements
 El Pollo Loco, fast food
 Embassy Suites Hotels, hotels
 EmbroidMe
 Energie Group
 ERA Real Estate, real estate
 Extreme Pizza, pizza

F

 FamilyMart
 Famous Dave's
 Fantastic Sams, hair
 Farmer Boys
 Firehouse Subs, fast food
 Five Guys, restaurant
 Fox's Pizza Den, pizza
 Freddy's Frozen Custard & Steakburgers
 Freedom Boat Club
 Fressnapf
 Friendly's Restaurants, restaurant
 Frisch's Big Boy, restaurant
 Fuddruckers, restaurant
 Furniture Medic

G
 GNC Franchising
 Gloria Jean's Coffee, coffee retailer
 Golden Corral, restaurant
 Gold's Gym, gym
 Great Clips, hair
 Grill'd, fast food
 Guzman y Gomez, fast food
 Gymboree

H

 Häagen-Dazs, fast food
 Hampton Inn/Hampton Inn & Suites, hotels
 Hard Rock Cafe, restaurants
 Hardee's, restaurants
 Harvey's
 Hawthorn Suites, hotels
 Hesburger, fast food
 Hilton Garden Inn, hotels
 Hilton Hotels & Resorts, hotels
 HobbyTown USA
 HomeVestors of America
 Homewood Suites by Hilton, hotels
 Hooters, restaurants
 Howard Johnson International, hotels
 Hungry Howie's Pizza & Subs, pizza
 Hungry Jack's, fast food
 Hwy 55 Burgers, Shakes & Fries, restaurants

I
 IHOP, restaurants
 Instant Tax Service, financial services
 InterContinental Hotels Group, hotels
 Italianni's
 Ivar's restaurants

J

 Jack in the Box, fast food
 Jackson Hewitt Tax Service, financial services
 Jamba Juice, fast food
 Jani-King
 Jazzercise
 Jenny Craig
 Jerry's Subs & Pizza, pizza
 Jersey Mike's Subs, restaurants
 Jiffy Lube, automotive
 Jimmy John's Gourmet Sandwich Shops, restaurants
 Johnny Rockets, restaurants

K

 Kampgrounds of America
 Kentucky Fried Chicken, fast food
 Knights Inn, hotels
 Krystal Restaurants, restaurant
 Kwik Fit, car repair and servicing

L

 La Quinta Inns & Suites, hotels
 Lenny's Sub Shop, fast food
 Liberty Tax Service, financial services
 Little Caesars, pizza
 Little Gym, gyms
 LJ Hooker, real estate
 llaollao, fast food
 L'Occitane en Provence
 Long John Silver's Restaurants, fast food
 Louisa Coffee, coffee

M

 Maaco Auto Painting & Bodyworks
 Mac's Milk
 Mad Science
 MaggieMoo's International
 Maid-Rite
 Manchu Wok
 Marble Slab Creamery, fast food
 Martinizing Dry Cleaning, cleaning
 Matco Tools
 McAlister's Deli, restaurant
 McDonald's, fast food
 Meineke Car Care Center, automotive
 The Melting Pot, restaurant
 Merry Maids, cleaning services
 Metal Supermarkets
 Microtel Inn And Suites
 Midas Muffler
 Milio's Sandwiches, restaurant
 Moe's Southwest Grill, restaurant
 Molly Maid, home cleaning 
 Mooyah, fast food
 Motel 6, hotels
 Mr. Appliance
 Mr. Handyman
 Mr. Rooter
 Mr. Sub
 Muzz Buzz, coffee

N
 Nandos
 National Property Inspections
 Navis Pack & Ship Centers
 Netspace
 NightOwl Convenience Stores

O
 Office 1 Superstore
 Office Depot, office supplies
 Olive Garden, restaurant
 Orange Julius, fast food
 Outback Steakhouse, restaurant

P

 Pacha
 Panda Express, fast food
 Panera Bread/Saint Louis Bread Company
 Papa Gino's, pizza
 Papa Johns, pizza
 Papa Murphy's, pizza
 Party America
 Paychex
 Payless Car Rental 
 Pearle Vision, eyecare
 Perkins Restaurant and Bakery, restaurant
 Pet Supplies Plus
 Pick Up Stix
 Pita Pit, fast food
 The Pizza Company, pizza
 Pizza Fusion
 Pizza Hut
 Pizza Inn
 Pizza Nova 
 Pizza Pizza
 Pizza Ranch 
 Planet Fitness, gyms
 Play It Again Sports
 Play N Trade
 Popeyes Chicken & Biscuits, fast food
 PostNet

Q
 Qdoba Mexican Grill
 Quick, restaurant
 Quizno's, fast food

R

 Radisson Hotels & Resorts Worldwide, hotels
 Ralph Lauren Asia
 Ramada Worldwide, hotels
 RE/MAX, real estate
 Realty One Group, real estate
 Red Lobster, restaurant
 Red Mango
 Red Roof Inns, hotels
 Red Rooster, fast food
 Rent-A-Center, rentals
 Rent-A-Wreck, rental cars
 Rita's Italian Ice, fast food desserts
 Rocky Mountain Chocolate Factory
 Rosemary Conley Diet and Fitness Club
 Rotolo’s Pizzeria, restaurant
 Rubio's Fresh Mexican Grill, restaurant
 Ruby Tuesday, restaurant

S

 Studio 6, hotel
 Saladworks
 Salsa's Fresh Mex Grill, fast food
 Save-A-Lot
 Sbarro
 Schlotzsky's, fast food
 Sears Appliance Dealer
 Second Cup
 ServiceMaster Clean
 Shake's Frozen Custard, fast food
 Shakey's Pizza
 Shoney's, restaurant
 Signarama
 Slumberland Furniture
 Smoothie King, fast food
 Snap Fitness
 Snap-on Tools
 Snappy Snaps
 Sonic Drive In Restaurants, fast food
 Souper Salad, restaurant
 Spherion, temp agency
 Stanley Steemer Carpet Cleaner
 Staples Inc., office supplies
 Steak Escape
 Steak n Shake, fast food
 Subway
 Super 8 Worldwide
 Supercuts, hair
 Sweet Frog, frozen yogurt
 Swensen's
 Swiss Chalet
 Sylvan Learning Centers

T

 TCBY, fast food
 TGI Fridays, restaurant
 TKK Fried Chicken, fast food
 Taco Bell Corporation, fast food
 Taco Del Mar, fast food
 Taco John's, fast food
 Tim Hortons, fast food
 Total Wine & More
 Toys "R" Us, toys
 Travelodge Hotels, hotels
 Tropical Smoothie Cafe, fast food
 Truly Nolen, pest control
 Tudor's Biscuit World, restaurant
 Two Maids & A Mop, cleaning services
 Two Men and a Truck International

U
 U-Haul, truck rentals
 Ultra Tune, car repair and servicing
 Uno Chicago Grill
 UPS Store

V
 Value Place, extended-stay hotels
 Valvoline Instant Oil Change, automotive
 Village Inn
 Volvo Rents

W

 Waffle House, restaurant
 Wendy's, fast food
 Western Union
 Wetzel's Pretzels, pretzel store
 Whataburger, fast food
 Wienerschnitzel, fast food
 Wild Birds Unlimited
 Wing Zone, fast food
 Wingstop Restaurants, restaurant
 Woody's Chicago Style

Y
 Yogen Früz, frozen yogurt

Z
 Zaxby's, fast food
 Ziebart, automotive

See also
 List of pizza franchises

Franchises